AO-44 may refer to:

 APB, the silent variant of the Stechkin APS, had the factory name AO-44
 USS Patuxent (AO-44), a United States Navy refueling ship which saw service during World War I